This is a list of adult fiction books that topped The New York Times Fiction Best Seller list in 1961.

The most popular titles of the year were Hawaii by James Michener, The Agony and the Ecstasy, by Irving Stone and Franny and Zooey by J. D. Salinger with respectively 12, 27 and 10 weeks at the top. Hawaii had previously dominated the 1960 list, and Franney and Zooey continued into 1962 at the top of the list for a total run of 26 weeks. 

The only other book to top the list in 1961 was The Last of the Just by André Schwarz-Bart. That book, a multi-generational saga translated from the French, spent 18 weeks slowly rising to the top, and spent 4 weeks there before being toppled by The Agony and the Ecstasy. It continued among the top 15 best sellers for another 20 weeks.

References

1961
.
1961 in the United States